Sutjeska may refer to:

Sutjeska (river), a river in Bosnia and Herzegovina
Sutjeska National Park, a national park in Bosnia and Herzegovina
Kraljeva Sutjeska, a settlement in Bosnia and Herzegovina
Sutjeska Nikšić, a multi-sport club from Nikšić, Montenegro
FK Sutjeska Nikšić, football team
KK Sutjeska Nikšić, basketball team
RK Sutjeska Nikšić, handball team
Sutjeska Foča, a multi-sport club from Foča, Bosnia and Herzegovina
FK Sutjeska Foča, a football team
Sutjeska (village), a village in Serbia
Sutjeska (Zemun), a neighbourhood in Belgrade, Serbia
Battle of Sutjeska, a World War II battle in Yugoslavia
The Battle of Sutjeska (film), a 1973 Yugoslav film